Sport Copter Inc is an American aircraft manufacturer based in Scappoose, Oregon. The company specializes in the design and manufacture of autogyros.

The company subsidiary, Sport USA, LLC, produces rotor blades.

Aircraft

References

External links

Aircraft manufacturers of the United States
Autogyros
Privately held companies based in Oregon
Scappoose, Oregon